Hopewell is a civil parish in eastern Albert County, New Brunswick, Canada. It comprises one village and one local service district, both of which are members of the Southeast Regional Service Commission. The Hopewell Rocks are the parish's best known feature.

The Census subdivision of the same name includes all of the parish except the village of Riverside-Albert.

History
Hopewell parish originates in a 1765 one-hundred-thousand acre Cumberland County township grant within the British Colony of Nova Scotia, following "Le Grand Dérangement". The proprietors of the township may have named it for Hopewell, Pennsylvania, possibly the home of some of the settlers of the township.

The bounds of the township grant were described as follows, "To begin due west form  the point of land lying between the Memramcook and Petitcodiac on the west side of the Petitcodiac River and to extend from form  thence west twenty miles and from thence south to the seacoast on the Channel of Chignecto…excepting the lands lying within the said limits excepting 200 acres of land granted to John Burbridge Esq." 

Hopewell was erected as a parish in Westmorland County in 1786 when the province created its own system of counties and civil parishes. Unlike the rest of the province, Westmorland County's parishes did not have their boundaries explicitly described, instead stating only "to be bounded as in and by the several letters patent or grants of the said towns, under the great seal of the province of Nova Scotia". The original parish included Harvey Parish and parts of Alma and Elgin Parishes.

Boundaries
Hopewell Parish is bounded:

on the north by the northern line of a grant to Robert Dixon and Jesse Converse on Shepody Bay and its prolongation inland to a point about 1.35 kilometres north of Lumsden Road, where Elgin, Harvey, Hillsborough and Hopewell Parishes meet;
on the east and southeast by Shepody Bay;
on the south by Shepody Bay and the Shepody River;
on the west by a line running up Crooked Creek to the site of a former bridge across the creek, near the end of Mill Road in Riverside-Albert, then running north 22º west to the northern line.

Evolution of boundaries

In 1837 the county line between Saint John and Westmorland Counties shifted westward and the orphaned part of Saint John County was added to Hopewell. The next year the western part of Hopewell was included in the newly erected Harvey Parish.

In 1850 a consolidation of the legislation and amendments divinding the province into counties and parishes removed references to the pre-Loyalist townships from the boundaries of Albert County parishes.

Municipality
Riverside-Albert is located in the southwestern corner of the parish, along the Shepody River between the mouths of Crooked Brook and Chapman Creek.

Local service district
The local service district of the parish of Hopewell contains all of the parish outside Riverside-Albert.

The LSD was established on 23 November 1966 to assess for fire protection following the abolition of county councils by the new Municipalities Act. First aid & ambulance services were added on 21 January 1976.

Today the LSD assesses for community & recreation services in addition to the basic LSD services of fire protection, police services, land use planning, emergency measures, and dog control. The taxing authority is 616.00 Hopewell.

Communities
Communities at least partly within the parish. bold indicates an incorporated municipality; italics indicate a name no longer in official use

 Cape Station
 Chemical Road
 Chester
  Curryville
  Demoiselle Creek
  Hopewell Cape
  Hopewell Hill
 Lower Cape
 McGinley's Corner
 Memel Settlement
 Mountville
  Riverside-Albert
  Shepody

Bodies of water
Bodies of water at least partly within the parish.
Petitcodiac River
Shepody River
Crooked Creek
at least nine other named creeks
Shepody Bay

Other notable places
Parks, historic sites, and other noteworthy places at least partly within the parish.
  Hopewell Rocks Provincial Park

Demographics
Parish population total does not include Riverside-Albert

Population

Language
Mother tongue (2016)

Access Routes
Highways and numbered routes that run through the parish, including external routes that start or finish at the parish limits:

Highways

Principal Routes
None

Secondary Routes:

External Routes:
None

See also
List of parishes in New Brunswick

Notes

References

Parishes of Albert County, New Brunswick
Local service districts of Albert County, New Brunswick